The large moth family Gelechiidae contains the following genera:

References 

 Natural History Museum Lepidoptera genus database

Gelechiidae
Lists of Lepidoptera genera